The flavescent peacock (Aulonocara stuartgranti), also known as Grant's peacock, is a species of haplochromine cichlid.  Its common name refers to its "flavescent" (yellowish) colour.

It is endemic to Lake Malawi where found in the countries of in Malawi, Mozambique, and Tanzania.

The species Aulonocara steveni and A. hansbaenschi are treated as junior synonyms of A. stuartgranti'' by the IUCN and the Catalog of Fishes, but FishBase treat it as a valid species.

The specific name honours Stuart M. Grant (1937-2007), an exporter of cichlids from lake Malawi for the aquarium trade.

References

Flavescent peacock
Taxa named by Manfred K. Meyer
Taxa named by Rüdiger Riehl
Fish described in 1985
Taxonomy articles created by Polbot